Blackbraid is an American black metal project from the Adirondack Mountains, New York, formed in 2022. The project is the solo endeavor of its creator, Jon Krieger. Krieger is Native American and is also known by his pseudonym Sgah’gahsowáh, a Mohawk name meaning "the witch hawk".

History

Formation and Blackbraid I
Blackbraid's formation was first announced on February 7, 2022. Krieger was by that point a lifelong musician and had previously been involved informally with friends' projects, but Blackbraid is both his first serious project and his first solo one.

Blackbraid is part of the growing indigenous black metal scene in the United States. The project's first single, "Barefoot Ghost Dance on Blood Soaked Soil", was released shortly after on February 13, 2022. The song's lyrics allude to historical events such as the Wounded Knee massacre, which took place in 1890, and the more recent Dakota Access Pipeline protests of 2016. A second single, "The River of Time Flows Through Me", was released on March 16, 2022, and deals with the passing and fluidity of time. Blackbraid's debut album, Blackbraid I, was released on August 26, 2022. Krieger, a multi-instrumentalist, wrote and tracked the entire album apart from the drums, which were tracked by his friend Neil Schneider. Schneider also recorded, mixed, and mastered Blackbraid I. The cover art was done by Adrian Baxter.

The album melds conventional black metal with elements of traditional indigenous music, such as the Native American flute, and acoustic interludes. It was released to general critical acclaim, featuring on Rolling Stone's Best Metal Albums of 2022 list, Metal Injection's list of best underground metal albums of 2022, and Decibel'''s Top 40 Albums of 2022 list. Following its independent release on Bandcamp, it reached #1 on the website's metal chart and charted at #2 across all genres, in addition to being named one of the site's best metal releases for August 2022.

2023-present
Blackbraid announced its first full tour in spring 2023, as part of the Decibel Magazine Tour (presented by Metal Blade Records) and in support of Dark Funeral, Cattle Decapitation, and 200 Stab Wounds. It also announced festival appearances at Hellfest 2023 and Copenhell 2023.

Krieger has stated that a second album would be forthcoming in 2023, which would be "an expansion of the sound [he] developed in the first album" and into which he plans to incorporate more native instrumentation.

Influences
Musically, Krieger has cited Dissection, Gorgoroth, Satyricon, Opeth, Enslaved, Wolves in the Throne Room, Panopticon, Immortal, Bathory, and Mayhem as influences.

Lyrically, Krieger deals primarily with the themes of Native American history and connection to nature. Blackbraid I contains lyrics referring to genocide of indigenous peoples; of the track "Barefoot Ghost Dance on Blood Soaked Soil", Krieger said, "This song is about the suffering and genocide of my people all across these continents, and our resistance to it. I think in my head I was loosely writing about the Wounded Knee Massacre when I started but it quickly evolved into something much broader. It is definitely a war song." The single's cover art features American photographer Edward Curtis's 1908 photo "Sun dance pledgers--Cheyenne". Krieger has also used other Curtis photographs on Blackbraid merchandise, including "Kutenai Duck Hunter" and "Atsina Warrior".

However, Krieger has also been clear that Blackbraid is primarily an emotional outlet for him, saying, "I think music can be a powerful weapon no matter how it is used. Obviously, I would like to see strides towards decolonization made, but when it comes to Blackbraid, the project is largely just an outlet for my own emotions and is not politically oriented whatsoever." When asked whether he saw Blackbraid as resistance against far-right politics in black metal, he stated, "Obviously I hate nazis and consider them to be the biggest cowards on Earth, I’d happily beat a nazi’s ass any day but I’m not going to let the fact that they play music ruin black metal for me either." Blackbraid's music is "anti-Christian in nature", but "also not really about Satan".

Krieger views Blackbraid as a project that can help listeners reconnect with nature and help him explore his own relationship with nature: "For some Indigenous people, they think nature is ours, but I think it belongs to everyone, though Indigenous Americans really do seem to be more connected with it...And it doesn’t take much to enjoy nature. You just need to open your eyes. You're already connected; you’re just actively ignoring that connection. I think with Blackbraid, that’s really what I want the music to do. I don’t really need to educate people because they already know it's there; they've just forgotten, and I want Blackbraid to kind of reawaken things they may not think about every day."

DiscographyBlackbraid I'' (2022)

References

External links

American black metal musicians
Living people
Musical groups established in 2022
One-man bands